Future Music (stylised as FutureMusic) is a monthly magazine published by Future plc in the UK. It was founded in 1992 and is aimed primarily at record producers working in the electronic music field.

Future Music includes hardware and software reviews, tutorials, royalty-free samples and loops, and music by electronic artists. The magazine also has reviews of commercial releases within the electronic genre, regularly naming its "Album of the Month". Interviewees have included Aphex Twin, Grimes and Gary Numan, who appeared on the cover of the first issue. Future Music content has been reprinted by outlets including The Fader, Amiga Format and Loopmasters.

The journalist and broadcaster Dave Haslam characterised Future Music as "a specialist mag for techno boffins". Matt Feeney in The Lance recommended the publication as one of the best within electronic music, saying, "Future Music magazine is... intended not so much for the fans of electronic music as it is for the artists themselves."

References

External links
Official website
Future Music at YouTube

1992 establishments in the United Kingdom
Music magazines published in the United Kingdom
Magazines established in 1992
Monthly magazines published in the United Kingdom